Savatije Sokolović (1573 – d. 1586), was Archbishop of Peć and Serbian Patriarch from 1585 to 1586. Before that, he served as Metropolitan of Herzegovina from 1573 to 1585. He was a member of the notable Sokolović family, being a nephew of Serbian Patriarch Makarije Sokolović (1557–71). Savatije founded the Piva Monastery in 1573.

Life
Sokolović was born in Prijepolje, at the time part of the Sanjak of Herzegovina of the Ottoman Empire (now in Serbia).  He was a son of Vukašin, the "knyaz of Rudići", and was part of the notable Sokolović family, being a fraternal nephew of Patriarch Makarije (s. 1557–71), and relative to many other archbishops, and even Ottoman statesmen.

He succeeded his relative Antonije as the Metropolitan of Herzegovina in 1573, who then became the Serbian Patriarch; the Sokolović bishops were obviously succeeding each other as metropolitan of Herzegovina, then as coadjutor to the Serbian Patriarch, and finally as Serbian Patriarch. That same year, Savatije founded (as ktitor) the Piva Monastery, dedicated to the Dormition of the Most Holy Mother of God, located by the Piva river in the historical Piva region (the former župa of Piva, in modern-day western Montenegro).  The construction workers were brothers named Gavrilo and Vukašin. Russian historian Aleksandr Fedorovich Gilferding (1831–1872) said that the monastery was the greatest and most beautiful building in all of Herzegovina.

He remained the Metropolitan of Herzegovina until his enthronement as the Archbishop of Peć and Serbian Patriarch in 1585, and served until his presumed death in 1586 when the last mention is made of him, regarding the finished construction of Piva. He died before Gerasim. Historian S. Novaković (1842–1915) concluded that his death place was in the Ubožac- or Božac Monastery, although this has since been refuted.

Savatije proved himself more energetic than his predecessors, and boldly and persistently, with the help of Grand Vizier Sokollu Mehmed Pasha (Mehmed-paša Sokolović) and other Islamized Sokolović family members, and other Viziers of Serbian origin, to work for the strengthening of Church autonomy. Unfortunately, chronicles have no further information on his life, as is the case with many other Serbian patriarchs. Both Savatije and Sokollu Mehmed Pasha are depicted on the interior frescoes.

See also
List of heads of the Serbian Orthodox Church

References

Sources

External links
 Official site of the Serbian Orthodox Church: Serbian Archbishops and Patriarchs

16th-century Serbian people
16th-century Eastern Orthodox archbishops
People from Prijepolje
1586 deaths
16th-century births
Ottoman Serbia
Serbs from the Ottoman Empire
Patriarchs of the Serbian Orthodox Church
16th-century people from the Ottoman Empire
Bishops of Zahumlje-Herzegovina